{|

{{Infobox ship career
|Hide header=
|Ship country=United States
|Ship flag=
|Ship name=USS Vella Gulf
|Ship namesake=Battle of Vella Gulf
|Ship operator=
|Ship ordered=
|Ship builder=Todd Pacific Shipyards
|Ship laid down=7 March 1944
|Ship launched=19 October  1944
|Ship sponsor=
|Ship christened=
|Ship completed=
|Ship acquired=
|Ship commissioned=9 April 1945
|Ship recommissioned=
|Ship decommissioned=9 August 1946
|Ship reclassified=Helicopter carrier, CVHE-111, 12 June 1955; Cargo ship and aircraft ferry, T-AKV-111
|Ship refit=
|Ship struck=1 June 1960
}}

|}

She was laid down as Totem Bay on 7 March 1944 at Tacoma, Washington by the Todd-Pacific Shipyards. She was renamed Vella Gulf on 26 April 1944 and launched on 19 October 1944, sponsored by Mrs. Donald F. Smith. On 9 April 1945, she was commissioned with Captain Robert W. Morse in command.

Service history
Following initial local operations in Puget Sound, Vella Gulf sailed for San Diego and arrived there on 4 May to pick up the initial increment of her assigned Marine air group. After embarking them at the naval air station, the escort aircraft carrier conducted shakedown off the southern California coast and embarked the remainder of her group during this period. At the completion of a post-shakedown availability, she departed the west coast on 17 June, bound for Hawaii. She arrived at Pearl Harbor on 25 June and conducted 11 days of intensive training operations.Vella Gulf departed Pearl Harbor on 9 July, stopped at Eniwetok in the Marshalls on 16 July to refuel, and proceeded on to Guam, where she arrived four days later. On 23 July, she sailed for the Marianas to conduct air strikes against Rota and Pagan Islands. The next day, she launched 24 sorties against Pagan Island with her Vought F4U Corsairs, Grumman F6F Hellcat photographic aircraft, and Grumman TBM Avenger bombers. Three days later, the escort carrier launched 21 sorties against Rota, with a dozen Corsairs, eight Avengers and one Hellcat taking part. Light anti-aircraft fire from Japanese guns peppered the skies but failed to reach the American planes. Two planes returned from the mission having conducted their attacks from such a low altitude that shrapnel from their own bomb explosions slightly damaged their tail surfaces.

The day after the Rota strike, the ship flew off her planes to Saipan and then returned to Apra Harbor, Guam, on 2 August, for a three-day breather before heading for Okinawa on 5 August. She arrived at Buckner Bay four days later. Her one night spent in the anchorage there was a memorable one since, during the evening, word arrived that surrender negotiations with the Japanese were in progress and prompted many ships and shore-based units to set off pyrotechnics.Vella Gulf arrived back at Guam on 15 August in time to receive the welcome news that Japan had capitulated. Vella Gulf participated in the initial occupation operations of the Japanese home islands. The escort carrier then sailed for Tokyo Bay and arrived there on 10 September.

Departing Japanese waters on 21 September, Vella Gulf embarked 650 men at Okinawa for passage back to the west coast of the United States. After a brief stop at Pearl Harbor, she arrived at San Francisco, California, on 14 October. She subsequently operated in the Puget Sound area as training ship for escort carrier personnel until late March 1946, when she sailed for the coast of southern California and arrived at San Diego on 27 March. However, her stay there was brief, for she soon got underway again, touched at Port Angeles, and pushed on to Tacoma, where she began inactivation on the last day of the month. Moved to Seattle on 7 April, the ship was placed out of commission on 9 August 1946.

Placed in reserve at Tacoma, the vessel remained there into the 1960s. Reclassified as a helicopter carrier (CVHE-111) on 12 June 1955, Vella Gulf was later transferred to the Military Sea Transportation Service; and she was again reclassified — this time to T-AKV-11. However, she never returned to active service. Struck from the Navy list on 1 June 1960, she was reinstated on 1 November of the same year. Struck for the second time on 1 December 1970, the erstwhile escort carrier was sold to the American Ship Dismantlers, Inc., of Portland, Oregon, on 22 October 1971 and scrapped.

AwardsVella Gulf'' received one battle star for her World War II service.

References

Commencement Bay-class escort carriers
World War II escort aircraft carriers of the United States
Ships built in Tacoma, Washington
1944 ships